The 1984 United States presidential election in Mississippi took place on November 6, 1984. All fifty states and the District of Columbia, were part of the 1984 United States presidential election. Mississippi voters chose seven electors to the Electoral College, which selected the president and vice president of the United States.

Mississippi was won by incumbent United States President Ronald Reagan of California, who was running against former Vice President Walter Mondale of Minnesota. Reagan ran for a second time with former C.I.A. Director George H. W. Bush of Texas, and Mondale ran with Representative Geraldine Ferraro of New York, the first major female candidate for the vice presidency.

The presidential election of 1984 was a very partisan election for Mississippi, with over 99% of the electorate voting only either Democratic or Republican.  All but two counties gave either Mondale or Reagan an outright majority; Leflore and Issaquena Counties gave Reagan a plurality. Reagan's best county was Lamar, where he got 79.9% of the vote; Mondale's was Jefferson, where he got 77.9%. Despite Reagan's overall landslide win in the state, Jefferson County, which possessed the largest African-American share of United States county's population, gave Mondale his fourth-largest vote share of any county or county-equivalent, after the District of Columbia, Macon County, Alabama, and majority-Native American Shannon County, South Dakota.

Mississippi weighed in for this election as 3% more Republican than the national average. , this is the last election in which the following counties voted for a Republican presidential candidate: Clay, Issaquena, Jefferson Davis, Sunflower, and Tallahatchie.

Reagan won Mississippi by a landslide 24.4% margin. As in many other Southern states, this was a dramatic contrast with 1980, when Reagan won the Magnolia State over Southerner Jimmy Carter by a narrow margin of 1.3%. Mondale's strength was limited to Mississippi's Black Belt counties and to a moderate overperformance in Hinds County, the state's largest county, where Mondale got 42%--in the next four largest counties (Harrison, Jackson, Rankin, and Lauderdale), Reagan exceeded 2/3 of the vote (exceeding 3/4 in Jackson and Rankin). Alabama and Mississippi voted alike in every election except for 1840.

Democratic platform
Walter Mondale accepted the Democratic nomination for presidency after pulling narrowly ahead of Senator Gary Hart of Colorado and Rev. Jesse Jackson of Illinois - his main contenders during what would be a very contentious Democratic primary. During the campaign, Mondale was vocal about reduction of government spending, and, in particular, was vocal against heightened military spending on the nuclear arms race against the Soviet Union, which was reaching its peak on both sides in the early 1980s.

Taking a (what was becoming the traditional liberal) stance on the social issues of the day, Mondale advocated for gun control, the right to choose regarding abortion, and strongly opposed the repeal of laws regarding institutionalized prayer in public schools. He also criticized Reagan for his economic marginalization of the poor, stating that Reagan's reelection campaign was "a happy talk campaign," not focused on the real issues at hand.

A very significant political move during this election: the Democratic Party nominated Representative Geraldine Ferraro to run with Mondale as Vice-President. Ferraro is the first female candidate to receive such a nomination in United States history. She said in an interview at the 1984 Democratic National Convention that this action "opened a door which will never be closed again," speaking to the role of women in politics.

Republican platform

By 1984, Reagan was very popular with voters across the nation as the President who saw them out of the economic stagflation of the early and middle 1970's, and into a period of (relative) economic stability.

The economic success seen under Reagan was politically accomplished (principally) in two ways. The first was initiation of deep tax cuts for the wealthy, and the second was a wide-spectrum of tax cuts for crude oil production and refinement, namely, with the 1980 Windfall profits tax cuts. These policies were augmented with a call for heightened military spending, the cutting of social welfare programs for the poor, and the increasing of taxes on those making less than $50,000 per year. Collectively called "Reaganomics", these economic policies were established through several pieces of legislation passed between 1980 and 1987.

These new tax policies also arguably curbed several existing tax loopholes, preferences, and exceptions, but Reaganomics is typically remembered for its trickle down effect of taxing poor Americans more than rich ones. Reaganomics has (along with legislation passed under presidents George H. W. Bush and Bill Clinton) been criticized by many analysts as "setting the stage" for economic troubles in the United States after 2007, such as the Great Recession.

Virtually unopposed during the Republican primaries, Reagan ran on a campaign of furthering his economic policies. Reagan vowed to continue his "war on drugs," passing sweeping legislation after the 1984 election in support of mandatory minimum sentences for drug possession.  Furthermore, taking a (what was becoming the traditional conservative) stance on the social issues of the day, Reagan strongly opposed legislation regarding comprehension of gay marriage, abortion, and (to a lesser extent) environmentalism, regarding the final as simply being bad for business.

Results

Results by county

See also
 Presidency of Ronald Reagan

References

Mississippi
1984
1984 Mississippi elections